Tom McVerry (born 30 June 1980) is an Australian rugby union player who currently plays as a loose forward for the  in the international Super Rugby competition.

Career

McVerry started out his career in Queensland, playing age-level rugby and then progressing on to the Reds Academy.   He finally made the first team during the 2003 Super 12 season and went on to make 55 appearances for the franchise over the next 5 years.  A brief stint with the Ballymore Tornadoes, whom he captained during the inaugural Australian Rugby Championship in 2007 followed before he tried his luck overseas, initially in Italy before settling down in Japan where he spent 6 seasons with Kyuden Voltex.

During his time in Japan, McVerry´s wife suffered a brain tumour which forced him and his young family back to Australia’s capital while she was undergoing treatment.   This allied with an injury crisis which had severely depleted the Brumbies loose forward stocks saw him surprisingly handed a short-term contract until the end of the 2014 Super Rugby season.

International

McVerry was an Australia Schoolboys representative in 1997 and also appeared for the Australia Sevens team at the 2006 Commonwealth Games in Melbourne.

References

1980 births
Australian rugby union players
Rugby union flankers
Rugby union number eights
Living people
ACT Brumbies players
Queensland Reds players
Sportsmen from Queensland
Expatriate rugby union players in Japan
Expatriate rugby union players in Italy
Australian expatriate sportspeople in Italy
Kyuden Voltex players
Australian expatriate sportspeople in Japan